The Dark Energy Spectroscopic Instrument (DESI) is a scientific research instrument for conducting spectrographic astronomical surveys of distant galaxies. Its main components are a focal plane containing 5,000 fiber-positioning robots, and a bank of spectrographs which are fed by the fibers. The new instrument will enable an experiment to probe the expansion history of the universe and the mysterious physics of dark energy.

The instrument is operated by the Lawrence Berkeley National Laboratory under funding from the US Department of Energy's Office of Science. Construction of the new instrument, now completed, was principally funded by the US Department of Energy's Office of Science, and by other numerous sources including the US National Science Foundation, the UK Science and Technology Facilities Council, France's Alternative Energies and Atomic Energy Commission, Mexico's National Council of Science and Technology, Spain's Ministry of Science and Innovation, by the Gordon and Betty Moore Foundation, by the Heising-Simons Foundation, and by collaborating institutions worldwide.

Science goals 
The expansion history and large-scale structure of the universe is a key prediction of cosmological models, and DESI observations will permit scientists to probe diverse aspects of cosmology, from dark energy to alternatives to General Relativity to neutrino masses to the early universe. The data from DESI will be used to create three-dimensional maps of the distribution of matter covering an unprecedented volume of the universe with unparalleled detail. This will provide insight into the nature of dark energy and establish whether cosmic acceleration is due to a cosmic-scale modification of General Relativity. DESI will be transformative in the understanding of dark energy and the expansion rate of the universe at early times, one of the greatest mysteries in the understanding of the physical laws.

DESI will measure the expansion history of the universe using the baryon acoustic oscillations (BAO) imprinted in the clustering of galaxies, quasars, and the intergalactic medium.  The BAO technique is a robust way to extract cosmological distance information from the clustering of matter and galaxies. It relies only on very large-scale structure and it does so in a manner that enables scientists to separate the acoustic peak of the BAO signature from uncertainties in most systematic errors in the data.  BAO was identified in the 2006 Dark Energy Task Force report as one of the key methods for studying dark energy.   In May 2014, the High-Energy Physics Advisory Panel, a federal advisory committee, commissioned by the US Department of Energy (DOE) and the National Science Foundation (NSF) endorsed DESI.

3D map of the universe 

The baryon acoustic oscillations method requires a three-dimensional map of distant galaxies and quasars created from the angular and redshift information of a large statistical sample of cosmologically distant objects.  By obtaining spectra of distant galaxies it is possible to determine their distance, via the measurement of their spectroscopic redshift, and thus create a 3-D map of the universe.  The 3-D map of the large-scale structure of the universe also contains more information about dark energy than just the BAO and is sensitive to the mass of the neutrino and parameters that governed the primordial universe. During its five-year survey, which began on May 15, 2021, the DESI experiment is expected to observe 40 million galaxies and quasars.

Development 
The DESI instrument implements a new highly multiplexed optical spectrograph on the Mayall Telescope. The new optical corrector design creates a very large, 8.0 square degree field of view on the sky, which combined with the new focal plane instrumentation weighs approximately 10 tonnes. The focal plane accommodates 5,000 small computer controlled fiber positioners on a 10.4 millimeter pitch. The entire focal plane can be reconfigured for the next exposure in less than two minutes while the telescope slews to the next field.  The DESI instrument is capable of taking 5,000 simultaneous spectra over a wavelength range from 360 nm to 980 nm.  The DESI project scope included construction, installation, and commissioning of the new wide-field corrector and corrector support structure for the telescope, the focal plane assembly with 5,000 robotic fiber positioners and ten guide/focus/alignment sensors, a 40-meter optical fiber cabling system that brings light from the focal plane to the spectrographs, ten 3-arm spectrographs, an instrument control system, and a data analysis pipeline.

The instrument fabrication was managed by the Lawrence Berkeley National Laboratory and oversees operation of the experiment including a 600-person international scientific collaboration.  Cost of construction was $56M from the US Department of Energy's Office of Science plus an additional $19M from other non-federal sources including contributions in-kind. The leadership of DESI currently consists of the director, Dr. Michael E. Levi, collaboration co-spokespersons Prof. Kyle Dawson and Dr. Nathalie Palanque-Delabrouille,  project scientists Dr. David J. Schlegel and Dr. Julien Guy, project manager Dr. Patrick Jelinsky, instrument scientists Prof. Klaus Honscheid and Prof. Constance Rockosi. Past collaboration spokespersons have been  Prof. Daniel Eisenstein and Prof. Risa Wechsler.

DOE approved CD-0 (Mission Need) on September 18, 2012, approved CD-1 (Alternative Selection and Cost Range) on March 19, 2015, and CD-2 (Performance Baseline) on September 17, 2015. Congressional approval for the start of DESI as a new Major Item of Equipment was provided in the FY15 Energy & Water appropriations legislation.  Construction on the new instrument started June 22, 2016 with CD-3 (Start Construction) approval and was largely assembled by 2019 with commissioning finishing in March 21, 2020 in advance of the pandemic and marking the formal end of the project (CD-4).  DESI was completed under budget by $1.9M and 17 months ahead of schedule.  As a consequence, the project received the DOE Project Management Excellence Award for 2020.  After a pause for the pandemic and a transition to remote operations, DESI returned to survey operations in December, 2020 with a final checkout and validation phase prior to starting its planned five-year survey.  The five-year survey began on May 14, 2021.  DESI was shutdown for three months in the summer of 2022 due to the Contreras fire which engulfed Kitt Peak.  DESI was undamaged and is acquiring scientific data.

DESI Legacy Imaging Surveys 
To provide targets for the DESI survey three telescopes surveyed the northern and part of the southern sky in the g, r and z-band. Those surveys were the Beijing-Arizona Sky Survey (BASS), using the Bok 2.3-m telescope, the Dark Energy Camera Legacy Survey (DECaLS), using the Blanco 4m telescope and the Mayall z-band Legacy Survey (MzLS), using the 4-meter Mayall telescope. The area of the surveys is 14,000 square degrees (about one third of the sky) and avoids the Milky Way. These surveys were combined into the DESI Legacy Imaging Surveys, or Legacy Surveys. Colored images of the survey can be viewed in the Legacy Survey Sky Browser. The legacy survey covers 16,000 square degrees of the night sky containing 1.6 billion objects including galaxies and quasars out to 11 billion years ago.

History 

DESI received a go-ahead to start R&D for the project in December 2012 with the assignment of the Lawrence Berkeley National Laboratory as the managing laboratory.  Dr. Michael Levi, a senior scientist at the Lawrence Berkeley National Laboratory was appointed by the laboratory to be DESI's project director who served in that role starting in 2012 and throughout construction.  Henry Heetderks was project manager from 2013 until 2016, Robert Besuner was project manager from 2016 until 2020.  Congressional authorization was provided in 2015, and the US Department of Energy's Office of Science approved the start of physical construction in June 2016.  First light of the new corrector system was obtained on the night of April 1, 2019, and first-light of the entire instrument was achieved on the night of October 22, 2019.  Commissioning ensued after first light and was completed in March, 2020, then paused during the pandemic in 2020.  DESI is currently operating normally after surviving the Contreras fire in 2022.

References

External links 
Official DESI site
Telescope tracks 35 million galaxies in Dark Energy hunt, BBC Science report, 28 October 2019

Dark Energy Spectroscopic Instrument
Dark energy
Unsolved problems in physics
Telescopes
Lawrence Berkeley National Laboratory
Kitt Peak National Observatory